Jalore is one of the 200 Legislative Assembly constituencies of Rajasthan state in India. It is in Jalore district and is reserved for candidates belonging to the Scheduled Castes.

Members of the Legislative Assembly 
Sources:

Election results

2018

See also
List of constituencies of the Rajasthan Legislative Assembly
Jalore district

References

Jalore district
Assembly constituencies of Rajasthan